The county borough of Torfaen is in the south-east corner of Wales, occupying the valley of the Afon Llwyd, from Cwmbran and Pontypool up to Blaenavon. With only 2 prehistoric and 5 medieval scheduled sites, the list, like the landscape, is dominated by the Industrial monuments of the 18th and 19th centuries. In particular, the Blaenavon Industrial Landscape is a World Heritage Site.  Of the 25 monuments, 14 are found within the Blaenavon Community. All of the Torfaen administrative area lies within the historic county of Monmouthshire.

Scheduled monuments have statutory protection. The compilation of the list is undertaken by Cadw Welsh Historic Monuments, which is an executive agency of the National Assembly of Wales. The list of scheduled monuments below is supplied by Cadw with additional material from RCAHMW and Glamorgan-Gwent Archaeological Trust.

Scheduled monuments in Torfaen

See also
List of Cadw properties
List of castles in Wales
List of hill forts in Wales
Historic houses in Wales
List of monastic houses in Wales
List of museums in Wales
List of Roman villas in Wales
Grade I listed buildings in Torfaen
Grade II* listed buildings in Torfaen

References
Coflein is the online database of RCAHMW: Royal Commission on the Ancient and Historical Monuments of Wales, GGAT is the Glamorgan-Gwent Archaeological Trust, Cadw is the Welsh Historic Monuments Agency

Torfaen